Ekrem Koçak (18 May 1931 – 12 June 1993) was a Turkish middle distance runner who competed in the 1952 Summer Olympics and in the 1960 Summer Olympics.

He is the name sake of an athletic track in Istanbul.

References

1931 births
1993 deaths
Turkish male middle-distance runners
Olympic athletes of Turkey
Athletes (track and field) at the 1952 Summer Olympics
Athletes (track and field) at the 1960 Summer Olympics
Mediterranean Games gold medalists for Turkey
Mediterranean Games bronze medalists for Turkey
Mediterranean Games medalists in athletics
Athletes (track and field) at the 1955 Mediterranean Games
20th-century Turkish people